Henry Moore, 1st Earl of Drogheda PC (I) (died 11 January 1676) was an Anglo-Irish peer, politician and soldier.

Moore was the son of Charles Moore, 2nd Viscount Moore of Drogheda, by his wife Hon. Alice Loftus, the youngest daughter of Adam Loftus, 1st Viscount Loftus. He served in the Irish House of Commons as the Member of Parliament for Ardee between 1639 and 1643, when he succeeded to his father's viscountcy. He became a Royalist Colonel of Horse and served as Governor of Meath of Louth in 1643. Moore served in the forces of Confederate Ireland and fought at the Battle of Dungan's Hill in August 1647. In 1653 he was forced to pay £6,953 to the Commonwealth government in order to retain his estates under the Act for the Settlement of Ireland 1652. Following the Restoration he was made Governor of Drogheda in 1660 and invested as a member of the Privy Council of Ireland. On 14 June 1661, he was created Earl of Drogheda in the Peerage of Ireland.

He married Hon. Alice Spencer, sister of Henry Spencer, 1st Earl of Sunderland and the fifth daughter of William Spencer, 2nd Baron Spencer and Lady Penelope Wriothesley. They had five children. He was succeeded in 1676 by his eldest son, Charles.

His younger son Henry, who became the third Earl upon Charles's death in 1679—and assumed the name Henry Hamilton-Moore upon succeeding to the estates of his brother-in-law, Henry Hamilton, 2nd Earl of Clanbrassil—developed several streets in Dublin which still bear his name: Henry Street, Moore Street, North Earl Street, Of Lane (now "Off Lane") and Drogheda Street.

Alice outlived her husband by many years. She seems to have been a person of considerable strength of character. She was appointed guardian to her infant grandson Christopher Fleming, 17th Baron Slane (son of her daughter Penelope and the 16th Baron). She lobbied the Crown vigorously for restoration to her grandson of all lands forfeited by the Fleming family during the troubles of the 1640s and 50s.

References

Year of birth unknown
1676 deaths
17th-century Anglo-Irish people
Cavaliers
Moore, Henry
Members of the Irish House of Lords
Members of the Privy Council of Ireland
People of the Irish Confederate Wars
Members of the Parliament of Ireland (pre-1801) for County Louth constituencies
Earls of Drogheda